The Musée Hoangho Paiho (pinyin: Huang He Bai He Bowuguan) was a museum of natural history and fossils founded by the French Jesuit Émile Licent (1876–1952) in Tianjin, China, in 1914. Also known as the Beijiang Museum, it is now part of the Tianjin Natural History Museum.

About the museum 
The Musée Hoangho Paiho was established by the French Jesuit and natural historian Émile Licent in Tianjin, China, in 1914. The name translates as "Museum of the Yellow River and the White River". It was one of the first museums created in China. It was also known as the Beijiang Museum "Museum of Northern Borderlands"). In 1952, the museum was renamed as the Tianjin Natural History Museum.

The museum is located at 117–119 Machang Avenue, Hexi District, Tianjin, originally in the Institut des Hautes Études et Commerciales (now part of Tianjin Foreign Language University). It covers an area of 2000 square meters, consisting of two parts: the museum and the laboratory. The museum part (the northern part) was designed and constructed by the Credit Foncier D’Extreme Orient in 1922. The laboratory part (the southern part) was constructed by French Yonghe Company between 1925 and 1929. The two parts are connected by an enclosed overpass. The building is three-storied (part of it is two-storied).

The museum was well used by artists in Tianjin, including Liu Kuiliang (1885–1967).

Publications of the museum 
The series "Publications du Musée Hoang Ho Pai Ho" was published between 1916 and 1936, and printed at the Imprimerie de la mission catholique at Sienhsien:
No.12 Listes des sauriens et serpents des collections du Musée Hoang ho Pai ho de Tien Tsin, by P Pavlov 1932)
No.14. Les collections néolithiques du Musée Hoang ho Pai ho de Tien Tsin, by E. Licent
No.19. La Collection d'oiseaux du Musée Hoang ho Pai ho de Tien Tsin, by G Seys; Emile Licent (1933)
No.20. Les poissons des collections ichtyologiques du Musée Hoangho Paiho, by B. Iakovleff (B.P. Jakovlev) (1933) 
No.23 Reptilia and Amphibia collected in 1932 by the staff of the Hoang-ho Pai-ho Tientsin. Publications du Musée Hoang Ho Paiho, by P.A. Pavlov (1933)
No.25 Brahmaeidae des collections du Musée Hoangho Paiho, by V Strelkov (1933)
No.26. Collections des Mammifères du Musée Hoang ho Pai ho à Tien Tsin, by B Jakovleff; E de Laberbis (1933)
No.27. Notes sur les oiseaux observes an Jehol de 1911 a 1932, by G Seys (1933)
No.28.  Collection des mammifères du musée Hoang ho Pai ho de Tien Tsin. Carnivora. III. Fam. Ursidae et Mustelidae / par B.P. Jakovleff,... ; traduit du ms. russe par E. de Laberbis (1934)
No.30 Bibliographie critique du Musée Hoang ho Pai ho (H.H.P.H.) de Tien Tsin : 1914–1933 by Emile Licent (1934)
No.31. Additions faites de 1928 à 1933 à la collection d'oiseaux du Musée Hoang ho Pai ho de Tien Tsin, by G Seys; Emile Licent (1934)
No.34. The non-marine gastropods of north China. Part 1, by T.C. Yen (1935)
No.38. Hoang Ho-Pai Ho. Comptes-rendus de onze années (1923–1933) de séjour et d'exploration dans le Bassin du Fleuve Jaune, du Pai Ho et des autres tributaires du Golfe du Pei-Tcheu-Ly, by H.I. Harding, Émile Licent (1936)
No.41. A survey of the amphibia of north China based on the collection by E. Licent S.J. in the Musée Hoangho-Paiho de Tientsin, by Alice M Boring (1936)
No.42. Notes on some Dytiscidae from Musée Hoang ho Pai ho, Tientsin, with descriptions of eleven new species, by Hsiao-tʻang Fêng (1936)
No.45 A guide to Hoang ho Pai ho Museum, Race Course Road, Tientsin, by Emile Licent (1937)
No.51. Annélides Poluchètes du Golfe du Pei Tcheu Ly de la collection du musée Hoang ho Pai ho by Pierre Fauvel (1933)
 Hoang ho-Pai ho. Comptes-rendus de onze années, 1923–1933, de séjour et d'exploration dans le bassin du Fleuve Jaune, du Pai ho et des autres tributaires du Golfe du Pei Tcheu ly, by Émile Licent. [With atlas] (1935–1936)

External links 
Musée Hoang ho Pai ho – on Bibliothèque nationale de France website
Musée Hoang ho Pai ho – on Worldcat

References 

Museums in Tianjin
Natural history museums in China